Stella Inger Escobedo is an Uzbekistani-born American television news anchor and reporter who's currently working at One America News Network. She was formerly at KFMB, the CBS affiliate in San Diego where she was the morning and afternoon anchor. Inger-Escobedo joined CBS 8 after a short stint at CBS Newspath in Los Angeles as a network correspondent. Previously she was the 5, 6, and 10 p.m anchor at the ABC television affiliate, KGUN, channel 9, in Tucson, Arizona. Inger-Escobedo was employed by the station in 2013, and retired from her position there on November 30, 2018. Previously, she was the morning anchor/reporter of "Good Morning Arizona" on KTVK in Phoenix. Inger-Escobedo was the leading morning anchor for KPSP-TV in Palm Springs, California.

Early life
Inger-Escobedo was born to a Jewish family in 1982 in Tashkent, Uzbekistan. Her parents immigrated when she was six in 1989 first to Sioux City, Iowa and then Southern California. She grew up in Sherman Oaks, California. In 2004, she graduated from the University of Southern California where she was a broadcast journalism major.

Career
Inger-Escobedo was the leading morning anchor for KPSP-LP (CBS-TV) in Palm Springs, California.

In September 2012 and September 2011 Inger co-hosted the Chabad Telethon along with CNN's Larry King and KTLA's Sam Rubin.

She also co-hosted the Chabad Telethon in 2009 alongside celebrities including Oscar award winner Jon Voight, actor Tom Arnold and NBA Star Jordan Farmar.

In 2008 Inger was named by The Desert Sun as "The Best TV Personality in the Desert." In 2009 she won the same award for the second time.

In December 2008 Inger was featured alongside Kobe Bryant and Shaquille O'Neal in an AOL Sports report.

Before reporting for KPSP-LP, Inger was a reporter for KXLF-TV in Bozeman, Montana and KESQ-TV in Palm Desert, California.

References

American television journalists
American women television journalists
20th-century American Jews
Soviet emigrants to the United States
Living people
USC Annenberg School for Communication and Journalism alumni
People from Bozeman, Montana
People from Sherman Oaks, Los Angeles
Journalists from Montana
1983 births